Cristina Cubedo Pitarch (born 21 October 1999) is a Spanish footballer who plays as a defender for Villarreal playing in the Primera División.

Club career
Cubedo started her career at Villarreal B.

References

External links
Profile at La Liga

1999 births
Living people
Women's association football defenders
Spanish women's footballers
Sportspeople from Castellón de la Plana
Footballers from the Valencian Community
Villarreal CF (women) players
Valencia CF Femenino players
UD Granadilla Tenerife players
Primera División (women) players
21st-century Spanish women